Spiegle is a given name and surname. Notable people with the name include:

 Spiegle Willcox (1903–1999), American jazz trombonist
 Dan Spiegle (1920–2017), American comic book and cartoon artist
 Garry Spiegle, role-playing game designer

See also
 Spiegel (disambiguation)